Schinkel may refer to:

 Schinkel (surname)
 Schinkel (river), river in Amsterdam
 Schinkel, Schleswig-Holstein, municipality in Schleswig-Holstein, Germany
 5297 Schinkel, main-belt asteroid
 Karl Friedrich Schinkel, Prussian architect, city planner, and painter